The French submarine Marsouin was a  built for the French Navy in the mid-1920s. Laid down in November 1922, it was launched in December 1924 and commissioned in September 1927. It escaped from Toulon on 27 November 1942 and joined the Free French Naval Forces; it was later disarmed at Oran in April 1944, and stricken on 28 February 1946.

Design
Propulsion while surfaced was provided by two  diesel motors and two  electric motors.

References

Citations

World War II submarines of France
Requin-class submarines